William Ferry may refer to:

 William Montague Ferry (1796–1867), Presbyterian minister and missionary
 W. Mont Ferry (William Montague Ferry, 1871–1938), Utah state senator and mayor of Salt Lake City
 William H. Ferry (1819–1880), American politician from New York
 William Montague Ferry Jr. (1824–1905), Michigan and Utah politician and Union Army officer